Beylerbey (meaning the 'commander of commanders' or 'lord of lords') was a high rank in the western Islamic world in the late Middle Ages and early modern period, from the Anatolian Seljuks and the Ilkhanids to Safavid Empire and the Ottoman Empire. Initially designating a commander-in-chief, it eventually came to be held by senior provincial governors. In Ottoman usage, where the rank survived the longest, it designated the governors-general of some of the largest and most important provinces, although in later centuries it became devalued into a mere honorific title. The title is originally Turkic and its equivalents in Arabic were amir al-umara, and in Persian, mir-i miran.

Early use 

The title originated with the Seljuqs, and was used in the Sultanate of Rum initially as an alternative for the Arabic title of malik al-umara ("chief of the commanders"), designating the army's commander-in-chief. Among the Mongol Ilkhanids, the title was used to designate the chief amir al-ulus ("emir of the state")—also known by the Turkic title ulusbegi and the Arabic amir al-umara–while in the Golden Horde it was applied to all the holders of the rank of amir al-ulus. The Mamluks of Egypt possibly used it as an alternative title for the atabak al-asakir, the commander-in-chief of the army.

Ottoman use 

The Ottomans used the title  from the late 14th until the mid-19th century, with varying meanings and degrees of importance. The early Ottoman state continued to use the term  in the meaning of commander-in-chief, held by princes of the Ottoman dynasty: under the Ottoman Empire's founder, Osman I (ruled 1299–1326), his son Orhan held the post, and during Orhan's reign (1324–1362), his brother Alaeddin Pasha and Orhan's son  Süleyman Pasha.

The first step towards the transformation of the office into a gubernatorial title occurred when Murad I gave the title to Lala Shahin Pasha as a reward for his capture of Adrianople (modern Edirne) in the 1360s. In addition, Lala Shahin was given military authority over the Ottoman territories in Europe (Rumelia). This marked the  effectively as the viceroy of the European territories, as the Sultans still resided in Anatolia, and as the straits of the Bosporus and the Dardanelles, which connected the two parts of the Ottoman state, continued to escape full Ottoman control until the Fall of Constantinople in 1453.

Lala Shahin died after 1388. Sometime in 1385–87 Çandarlı Kara Halil Hayreddin Pasha succeeded him in the position of commander-in-chief in Rumelia. This process marked the birth of the first two, and by far the most important, s: those of Rumelia and Anatolia, while the third , that of Rûm, followed soon after.

Territorial s were subdivided into s or s under s. With the continuous growth of the Ottoman Empire in the 15th and 16th centuries, new provinces were established, and the ranks of the s swelled to a peak of 44 by the end of the 16th century. A list of s in 1609 mentions 32 in total: 23 of them regular s where revenue was distributed among the military fief-holders, while the rest (in North Africa and the Middle East) were under the salyane system, i.e. their revenue was sent to the imperial treasury, and the officials and soldiers were paid salaries from it. The size of these new provinces varied enormously: some containing as many as twenty s, and others as few as two, including the s own residence (or ). Among themselves, the various s had an order of precedence based on the date of conquest or formation of their provinces. The  of Rumelia, however, retained his pre-eminence, ranking first among the other provincial governors-general, and being accorded a seat in the  Imperial Council after 1536. In addition, the post was occasionally held by the Sultan's chief minister, the Grand Vizier himself.

In his province, the  operated as a virtual viceroy of the Sultan: he had full authority over matters of war, justice and administration, except in so far as they were limited by the authority of other officials also appointed by the central government, chiefly the various fiscal secretaries under the mal defterdari, and the kadı, who could appeal directly to the imperial government. In addition, as a further check to their power, the Janissary contingents stationed in the province's cities were outside his authority, and s were even forbidden from entering the fortresses garrisoned by the Janissaries. The  also had his own court and government council and could freely grant fiefs (s and s) without prior approval by the Sultan, although this right was curtailed after 1530, when beylerbey authority was restricted to the smaller s only. Reflecting the office's origin in the military, the primary responsibility of the s and their s was the maintenance of the  cavalry, formed by holders of the military fiefs, whom they led in person on campaign.

From the reign of Mehmed II onwards, the title of  also became an honorary court rank, coming after the viziers; both viziers and s were titled pashas, with the viziers sporting three horse-tails and the s two. From the 16th century on, however, viziers could be appointed as provincial s, enjoying precedence and authority over the ordinary s of the neighbouring provinces. Towards the end of the 17th century, the title of ' of Rumelia' (') also began to be awarded as an honorific rank, alongside the actual holder of the provincial post, even to officials unrelated to the provincial administration, such as the chief treasurer.

Safavid use 

Under the Safavid dynasty of Persia, the title was used from ca. 1543/44 on for governors (generically styled hakim) of the more important provinces. The title was thus used for the governors of Herat, Azerbaijan, Ganja, Karabakh, Shirvan, Fars, Iraq, and Astarabad. The Safavids also used the title of wali for provinces even more important than those of beylerbeys. Towards the end of the Safavid period, the title of beylerbey had been eclipsed by that of wali, most notably being the wali's of the shah's their Georgian areas.

References

Sources 
 
 
 
 
 

Gubernatorial titles
Commanders in chief
Ottoman titles
Government of the Ottoman Empire
Government of Safavid Iran
Turkish words and phrases
Titles of national or ethnic leadership
Titles in Bosnia and Herzegovina during Ottoman period